Henry Rowbotham (22 April 1911 – 1979) was an English footballer who played at inside-right.

Career
Rowbotham played for Cheddleton Mental Hospital before joining Port Vale in April 1931. He scored on his debut in a 1–0 win over Bradford City at The Old Recreation Ground on the last day of the season on 2 May 1931. The next season he was only used as a back-up player however, and he scored one goal in a 4–1 win over Preston North End at Deepdale on 24 October, making six Second Division appearances. He was released upon the end of the season and moved on to Cheshire County League club Hyde United. He scored 12 goals in 41 matches for Hyde in the 1932–33 campaign. He moved on to Accrington Stanley, playing four Third Division North games in 1933–34. He then scored 14 goals in 59 Third Division North games for Barrow in 1934–35 and 1935–36. Rowbotham played 19 Third Division North games for Rochdale in 1936–37, scoring one goal, before he joined non-league Tunbridge Wells Rangers.

Career statistics
Source:

References

1911 births
1979 deaths
People from Willington Quay
Footballers from Tyne and Wear
English footballers
Association football forwards
Port Vale F.C. players
Hyde United F.C. players
Accrington Stanley F.C. (1891) players
Barrow A.F.C. players
Rochdale A.F.C. players
Tunbridge Wells F.C. players
English Football League players